Gephyromantis pseudoasper, also known as the Massif Madagascar frog, is a species of frog in the family Mantellidae. It is endemic to northern Madagascar. It can be found both on the ground and in trees. Breeding takes place in streams.

Advertisement call 
The advertisement call of the species is an energetic, high-pitched series of notes, emitted often in the early hours of the morning.

References

pseudoasper
Endemic frogs of Madagascar
Taxa named by Jean Marius René Guibé
Amphibians described in 1974
Taxonomy articles created by Polbot